Marine Science Magnet High School of Southeastern Connecticut was the first public high school in Groton, Connecticut, in the United States. It opened on September 1, 2011.

In the academic year 2012–2013 there were 178 students enrolled in grades 9–11, of which 94 were male and 84 female. Approximately 93% were ethnically white, and 7% Hispanic.

Notes

Buildings and structures in Groton, Connecticut
Schools in New London County, Connecticut
Public high schools in Connecticut
Educational institutions established in 2011
2011 establishments in Connecticut